The football tournament at the 2017 Islamic Solidarity Games took place during May 2017. Each participating nation's football association selected 21 players for the tournament.

Algeria
Head coach: Chafik Ameur

Azerbaijan
Head coach: Yashar Vahabzade

Cameroon
Head coach: Richard Towa

Saudi Arabia
Head coach: Yousef Anbar

Morocco
Head coach: Jamal Sellami

Oman
Head coach: Hamed Al-Azani

Palestine
Head coach: Ayman Sandouqa

Turkey
Head coach: Nedim Yigit

References

2017
2017 Islamic Solidarity Games